Pennhurst station was a former train station in the borough of Spring City, Pennsylvania. It served as a station for the Pennsylvania Railroad. It was originally built to accommodate the Pennhurst State School and Hospital. It was demolished in 1959.

References 

Former Pennsylvania Railroad stations
Former railway stations in Chester County, Pennsylvania